The 2013 Tirreno–Adriatico was the 48th edition of the Tirreno–Adriatico cycling stage race, often known as the Race of the Two Seas. It started on 6 March in San Vincenzo and ended on 12 March in San Benedetto del Tronto and consisted of seven stages, including a race-commencing team time trial and a race-concluding individual time trial. It was the third race of the 2013 UCI World Tour season.

The race was won for the second consecutive year by Italy's Vincenzo Nibali of the  team – becoming the first rider to do so since Tony Rominger in 1989 and 1990 – who took the race lead on the penultimate stage, and held the lead to the end of the race, the following day in San Benedetto del Tronto. Nibali won the general classification by 23 seconds over runner-up Chris Froome, who won the race's queen stage – the fourth stage – at a summit finish at Prati di Tivo. 's Alberto Contador completed the podium, 29 seconds behind Froome and 52 seconds down on Nibali. Contador was also the winner of the points classification, taking home the red jersey for amassing the highest number of points during stages at intermediate sprints and stage finishes.

In the race's other classifications, 's Michał Kwiatkowski was the winner of the white jersey for the young rider classification as he was the highest placed rider born in 1988 or later, finishing in fourth place overall, having led the general classification for one stage.

Teams
As Tirreno–Adriatico was a UCI World Tour event, all UCI ProTeams were invited automatically and obligated to send a squad. Originally, eighteen ProTeams were invited to the race, with four other squads given wildcard places, and as such, would have formed the event's 22-team peloton. Originally admitted to the event as a wildcard,  subsequently regained their ProTour status after an appeal to the Court of Arbitration for Sport.

The 22 teams that competed in the race were:

Among the 176-rider start list were five previous winners of the race, including the most recent three riders to win.

Race overview

Stages

Stage 1
6 March 2013 — San Vincenzo to Donoratico,  team time trial (TTT)

The opening stage team time trial was contested over the same  parcours that the 2012 edition of the race started with. On that occasion it was the  team that won by seventeen seconds from their closest rivals, completing the course in a time of 18' 41". The 2013 running of the team time trial was never going to trouble that sort of time due to the weather conditions beside the Mediterranean Sea, as rain caused treacherous conditions for the teams.  were the first team over the start line in San Vincenzo, and set the early benchmark with a time of 20' 19", but only held the top spot for a short period, as the defending winners  went beneath twenty minutes for the course by recording a time of 19' 48". After a fifteenth-place finish on the stage in 2012,  improved vastly with their performance, getting to within seven seconds of the time of the  – with the team describing their performance as a confidence boost – but both would be usurped by the pre-stage favourites .

With proficient time trial riders Tony Martin, Michał Kwiatkowski and Niki Terpstra among their ranks, the squad were fastest by three seconds at the midway point of the stage, which was later extended to eleven seconds by the time they reached Donoratico, stopping the clock with an eventual stage-winning time of 19' 24". As Mark Cavendish was the first of the team's riders to cross the line, he was entitled to wear the race's first azzurra jersey, but attributed the acclaim to Martin, who he believed had done most of the work during the stage. Kwiatkowski was also part of the train at the finish – as well as Terpstra and Zdeněk Štybar – and thus was the best placed rider under the age of 25, and was entitled to wear the first white jersey. Of the overall contenders, defending champion Vincenzo Nibali and his  squad were best positioned in fifth place, trailing  by exactly twenty seconds. Chris Froome's  outfit gave up five seconds to Nibali in a time of 19' 49", while , with Alberto Contador amongst their ranks, recorded a time of 19' 56", twelve seconds behind Nibali.

Stage 2
7 March 2013 — San Vincenzo to Indicatore, 

However, this did not stop the stage being set up for the sprinters' benefit. There were two categorised climbs in the first half of the stage, at the Massa Marittima and the Cantoniera Montebello respectively, but after descending from the latter climb, the rest of the parcours was relatively flat before entering Indicatore for the first time. From then on, five laps of a  finishing circuit were to be completed, with bonus time on offer at intermediate sprint points on the second and fourth passes of the finish line.

A trio of riders – 's Garikoitz Bravo,  rider Cesare Benedetti and Kevin Hulsmans of  – made the early breakaway from the field, and managed to extend their advantage to the main field to around nine minutes at one point during the stage, before eventually stabilising at the seven-minute mark for the majority of the stage. Bravo and Benedetti each led over one of the day's two climbs, with a tie between the two on points in the mountains classification, with the day's general classification standings ultimately being the tie-breaker; ultimately, it was Bravo that finished highest, and thus he took the race's first green jersey. He would drop back from the lead trio first, thus leaving Benedetti and Hulsmans to continue on, at the head of the race. Race leader Mark Cavendish, the winner in Indicatore in 2012, was able to gain a second at the first intermediate sprint, to establish a virtual one-second lead on the road.

Cavendish added a further two seconds at the second intermediate sprint point – won by 's Maciej Bodnar – while his  team-mate Michał Kwiatkowski was also able to gain a second at the sprint, in effect, boosting his own lead in the young rider classification. On the penultimate lap, 's Sep Vanmarcke tried to establish a solo move in the heavy rain that had been falling for most of the stage, but was caught by the main field after several kilometres off the front.  moved to the front of the peloton on the final lap, hoping to set up Peter Sagan for the sprint finish.  led the sprint out in the closing metres for André Greipel, but first Sagan and then 's Matthew Goss both came past him, with Goss ultimately taking the stage win on the line – his first win of the season – ahead of 's Manuel Belletti and Gerald Ciolek, riding for World Tour débutants . Cavendish maintained the leader's jersey after finishing fifth in the sprint – criticising his team's lead-out in the process – while Greipel and Sagan finished seventh and ninth respectively.

Stage 3
8 March 2013 — Indicatore to Narni Scalo, 

For the second stage running, the stage was set up for sprinters, with only one categorised climb during the  parcours. The remaining  of the stage after the climb, were undulating around Narni and Narni Scalo. After a  circuit towards the finish, the riders completed a final loop of  before reaching the finish. For the second day running,  rider Cesare Benedetti and mountains classification leader Garikoitz Bravo of the  team both made it into the day's breakaway, where again they were joined by a member of the  team, with Francesco Failli completing the lead trio. The trio quickly established an advantage over the main field, which they extended to around nine minutes before the climb at Todi, where Benedetti was able to take the green jersey from Bravo.

Benedetti was able to do so, as he led over the top of the climb ahead of Failli and Bravo. At this point, Bravo departed the breakaway and returned to the main field. Benedetti and Failli continued apace out front, while the peloton slowly brought the peloton back, in order to not catch the leaders too quickly and create opportunities for riders to attack before the finish in Narni Scalo.  were mainstays at the front of the group, hoping to set up a sprint for Peter Sagan. As wet conditions hit the race once again, several mini-attacks occurred on the run-in to the finish, with 's Lars Boom heading onto the final circuit with a small lead over the peloton. His attack was brought back before the end, as were solo attacks by Failli's team-mate Matteo Rabottini and 's Sergey Lagutin – the latter's attempt ending inside the final kilometre – setting up the final sprint. Matthew Goss, in the red jersey for points classification leader, for  launched his sprint first, but Gerald Ciolek came past him on the outside, before fading. Sagan and race leader Mark Cavendish also came past him, with the former winning on the line, beating Cavendish for the first time in a head-to-head sprint. Cavendish extended his overall lead with bonus seconds on offer for second place, while taking the points lead from Goss.

Stage 4
9 March 2013 — Narni to Prati di Tivo, 

The queen stage of the 2013 Tirreno–Adriatico, the fourth stage saw the summit finish at Prati di Tivo for the second consecutive year, where Vincenzo Nibali soloed away to a sixteen-second victory after attacking with  left to climb, en route to winning the race overall in the final individual time trial stage. From the start in Narni, the  parcours steadily rose, with three categorised climbs as part of the itinerary; the Forca di Arrone and the Capannelle Pass were both ascented but were not major tests to the riders, as both had average gradients of lower than 5%, but this was the preparation to the climb to Prati di Tivo. There was also the second of the day's intermediate sprints during the climb, at Pietracamela, coming with just under  remaining.

Failli was in the breakaway to try and take the mountains classification lead away from 's Cesare Benedetti, and ultimately did so, after taking maximum points at the first two climbs on the route.  and the  moved to the front of the peloton behind, keeping their respective protected riders out of danger, prior to the final climb. The lead quartet held a lead of under two minutes at the foot of the climb, with the peloton closing quickly.

With such a pace behind, Marczyński went off the front on his own, in order to prevent himself being caught for as long as possible. He held a lead of around 45 seconds with  remaining, as  led the chase in the peloton with five riders on the front, protecting Chris Froome, who was one of the favourites for the stage. Marczyński was caught not long after, with 's pace reducing numbers in the peloton drastically, with Cadel Evans, Joaquim Rodríguez and Roman Kreuziger among those dropped.  rider Alberto Contador tried several times to get clear, and at one point, had formed a group with Nibali and Failli's team-mate Mauro Santambrogio. Froome was able to get back to them with assistance from 's Chris Horner, and countered over the top of the group, and soloed away to a six-second margin of victory, ahead of Santambrogio who finished second, with Nibali in third.

Stage 5
10 March 2013 — Ortona to Chieti, 

The race finished in Chieti for the fourth successive year, after a long day in the saddle for the peloton. After a substantial descent, the riders headed towards the second climb via the first of two intermediate sprint points at Lettomanoppello, before the steep Passo Lanciano. The Lanciano,  at 8.6%, was introduced by race organisers for the 2013 edition in order to make the run in to Chieti more demanding than before. Upon cresting the top of the climb, there was a false flat to the finish on the Via Salomone.

Nine riders formed the day's breakaway after  of racing, with the advantage that they held increasing to a maximum of over eight minutes at the top of the first climb on the day. Cunego's solo move was ultimately unsuccessful, as he was the last member of the breakaway to be brought back by the peloton with around  remaining. 's pace on the front was reducing numbers in the peloton, with 2012 Chieti winner Peter Sagan being dropped. He got a gap, and soloed away to his second victory of the season. A group of five riders came across the line eight seconds in arrears, with Chris Froome among them, to take the leader's blue jersey from 's Michał Kwiatkowski.

Stage 6
11 March 2013 — Porto Sant'Elpidio to Porto Sant'Elpidio, 

The penultimate stage of the race was held as a circuit race around Porto Sant'Elpidio, with an itinerary of  being held over two separate circuits. Firstly, the riders completed two laps of a circuit  in length –  were covered in the neutral zone before the real start of the stage – before the peloton turned onto another circuit, this time  in length, towards the stage finish back along the Adriatic coast. These figures were dwarfed in comparison to the maximum gradient of the climb, listed by race organisers as reaching 27%.

Continuing a theme that has occurred throughout the race, wet conditions greeted the riders in Porto Sant'Elpidio for the start of the stage. The breakaway of the day was sizable, as sixteen riders made up the group. With such a large group, the peloton did not allow for a large gap to be created over themselves, keeping the gap below four minutes for the majority of the stage, before reaching an absolute maximum of around four-and-a-half minutes. With around  remaining, 's Tom Dumoulin and Damiano Cunego of  attacked out of the lead group, hitting the climb in Sant'Elpidio a Mare off the front. Five riders were able to rejoin the lead duo, as the peloton continually closed down on the group. Dumoulin attacked again on the final ascent of the climb, and was joined by the 's Beñat Intxausti. Intxausti soon left Dumoulin and crossed the top of the climb first.

's Peter Sagan also joined them, after the peloton had been led by his team to keep him out of any available danger on the wet roads. Intxausti and Sánchez were both later dropped from the lead group, while the previous day's stage winner Joaquim Rodríguez soon bridged up to the group from a separate group of chasers, among them was the points classification leader,  rider Alberto Contador. Sagan was ultimately strongest for the finish, taking his second stage victory of the week, and further adding to his favourite tag for Milan–San Remo. Nibali and Rodríguez followed two seconds behind, and with Chris Froome losing forty-eight seconds to Nibali, the  rider moved into the azzurra jersey ahead of the final time trial. Nearly a third of the peloton abandoned the race during the stage due to the conditions, to which race director Michele Acquarone apologised for, on social networking service Twitter.

Stage 7
12 March 2013 — San Benedetto del Tronto,  individual time trial (ITT)

Tirreno–Adriatico ended with an individual time trial in San Benedetto del Tronto for the third successive year, with the Marche city playing host to a perfectly flat out-and-back ride right along the Adriatic coast; it was held on the largely the same course as the 2011 and 2012 editions – although  shorter in 2013 – won on both occasions by Fabian Cancellara, winning in times of 10' 33" and 10' 36" respectively. Cancellara of the  team and 's Tony Martin were regarded as the pre-stage favourites, while in the battle for the overall race victory, it was expected that Vincenzo Nibali would win the race for the second successive year, having overturned a six-second deficit to Cancellara's team-mate Chris Horner to win the race in the time trial, in 2012.

As was customary of time trial stages, cyclists set off in reverse order from where they were ranked in the general classification at the end of the previous stage. Velits set a time of 11' 25" for the course, but was immediately beaten by 's Jens Mouris, who went inside the 11-minute barrier, with a time of 10' 52". His time held on top for around half an hour, before being bettered twice within the space of a minute by two  team-mates, Hayden Roulston and Cancellara. Roulston went seven seconds quicker than Mouris to take top spot, but Cancellara went eight quicker than Roulston to assume top spot in a time of 10' 37". 's Adriano Malori deposed Cancellara of the fastest time not long after, with a time of 10' 31", but ultimately, Martin improved upon that time, setting an eventual stage-winning time of 10' 25", passing his minute man Egoi Martínez on the stage. This gave Martin his second time trial win of the season, having won a final day time trial at the Volta ao Algarve.

The focus then moved to the overall battle, with Andrey Amador of the  taking eighth place from Malori's team-mate Przemysław Niemiec, after Amador recorded the third fastest time for the stage. The final place on the overall podium was also settled on the stage, with three riders within twenty-one seconds of one another, pre-stage. Young rider classification leader Michał Kwiatkowski, fifth overall overnight, set a target of 10' 46" for the other riders to follow. 's Joaquim Rodríguez recorded a time of 11' 08" for the course, but was not good enough to remain ahead of Contador and Kwiatkowski, missing the podium by two seconds, leaving him disappointed. Chris Froome set a time of 10' 40" for Nibali to chase in the battle for the victory, which Nibali prevailed in, losing around a third of his 34-second overnight lead on the stage.

Classification leadership table
In the Tirreno–Adriatico, four different jerseys were awarded. For the general classification, calculated by adding each cyclist's finishing times on each stage, and allowing time bonuses in intermediate sprints and at the finish in mass-start stages, the leader received a blue jersey. This classification was considered the most important of the 2013 Tirreno–Adriatico, and the winner was considered the winner of the race itself.

Additionally, there was a points classification, which awarded a red jersey. In the points classification, cyclists got points for finishing in the top ten in a stage. The stage win awarded 12 points, second place awarded 10 points, third 8, and one point fewer per place down the line, to a single point for tenth. In addition, the first four riders across the intermediate sprint lines earned points, 5, 3, 2, and 1 in succession.

There was also a mountains classification, which awarded a green jersey. In the mountains classification, points were won by reaching the top of a mountain before other cyclists. There were twelve recognised climbs in the race, and unlike most other races, the climbs were not separated into categories – each awarded the same points to the first four riders over its summit, on a scale of 5, 3, 2, and 1 in succession.

The fourth jersey represented the young rider classification, marked by a white jersey. This was decided the same way as the general classification, but only riders born after 1 January 1988 were eligible to be ranked in the classification.

There was also a classification for teams, in which the times of the best three cyclists per team on each stage were added together; the leading team at the end of the race was the team with the lowest total time.

Final standings

General Classification

Points Classification

King of the Mountains Classification

Young Rider Classification

References

External links

Tirreno–Adriatico
Tirreno-Adriatico
Tirreno-Adriatico